Take Me to Your Leader is the twenty fourth studio album by UK rock group Hawkwind. Released in 2005, it was their first studio album in five years. It featured guest appearances by Arthur Brown, Lene Lovich, the television presenter Matthew Wright and past member Lemmy. The first 2000 copies came with a DVD containing interviews with band members and some live and "behind the scenes" footage .

Track listing

CD
"Spirit of the Age" (Brock, Calvert) – 6:43
"Out Here We Are" (Davey) – 5:56
"Greenback Massacre" (Davey) – 4:14
"To Love a Machine" (Brock) – 6:00
"Take Me to Your Leader" (Brock, Chadwick, Davey) – 5:50
"Digital Nation" (Chadwick) – 5:25
"Sunray" (Brown) – 3:55
"Sighs" (Brock, Davey) – 1:22
"Angela Android" (Brock, Chadwick) – 5:08
"A Letter to Robert" (Brock, Brown, Chadwick) – 6:08

Bonus DVD
Interview With Dave Brock
Interview With Alan Davey
Interview With Richard Chadwick
"Spirit of the Age" – Promo
"Silver Machine" – Ruisrock Festival, Finland, 10 July 2004
"The Right to Decide" – Live 1992
"Spirit of the Age" – Live 2004
"Psychedelic Warriors" – Live 2004

Personnel 
Hawkwind
Dave Brock – guitar, vocals, keyboards
Alan Davey – bass guitar, vocals, keyboards
Richard Chadwick – drums, percussion and programming
with
James Clemas – organ (tracks 1 and 7)
Matthew Wright – vocals (track 1)
Jez Huggett – saxophone (tracks 2 and 6)
Jason Stuart – keyboards (tracks 3 and 4)
Simon House  – keyboards and violin (tracks 7 and 9)
Arthur Brown – vocals (tracks 7 and 10)
Lene Lovich – vocals (track 9)
Lemmy – vocals, bass (DVD track 5)
Phil Caivano – guitar (DVD track 5)

References

2005 albums
Hawkwind albums
Albums produced by Dave Brock